Vitaliy Boiko (30 September 1937 – 30 January 2020) was a Ukrainian lawyer, diplomat, and Minister of Justice.

Boiko was from Chernihiv Oblast. He graduated from Yaroslav Mudryi National Law University in 1963 and until 1976 worked as a judge in Dnipropetrovsk and then until 1986 as a judge in Donetsk.

In 1986 to 1992 Boiko worked in Ministry of Justice and held ministerial post. Concurrently with that he also headed the Central Electoral Commission. In 1993–1994 Boiko served as an Ambassador of Ukraine to Moldova. In 1994–2002 he was a chairman of the Supreme Court of Ukraine.

He was awarded the Honorary Award of the President of Ukraine, the forerunner of the Order of Merit.

References

External links
 History of Ministry of Justice. Ministry of Justice of Ukraine website.
 Vitaliy Boiko at the Official Ukraine Today

1937 births
2020 deaths
People from Chernihiv Oblast
Yaroslav Mudryi National Law University alumni
20th-century Ukrainian lawyers
21st-century Ukrainian lawyers
Ambassadors of Ukraine to Moldova
Justice ministers of Ukraine
Central Election Commission (Ukraine)
Judges of the Supreme Court of Ukraine
Academic staff of the Interregional Academy of Personnel Management
Recipients of the Order of Prince Yaroslav the Wise, 5th class
Chevaliers of the Order of Merit (Ukraine)
Laureates of the Honorary Diploma of the Verkhovna Rada of Ukraine